Vello Pähn (born 30 May 1958) is an Estonian conductor.

Since 2012 he is the principal conductor and artistic director at the Estonian National Opera.

In 2016 he received Estonian Music Council's Prize under the category "Interpretation Prize".

References

Living people
1958 births
Estonian conductors (music)
Estonian Academy of Music and Theatre alumni